Andre Francis (born 5 October 1961 in Kingston, Jamaica) is a former cornerback in the Canadian Football League for eleven years. He played college football at New Mexico State University.  He wore the number one.
Francis was selected to the British Columbia Lions' 2004 50th Anniversary Dream Team.

References

1961 births
Living people
Sportspeople from Kingston, Jamaica
Canadian football defensive backs
Montreal Concordes players
BC Lions players
Saskatchewan Roughriders players
Edmonton Elks players
Ottawa Rough Riders players
New Mexico State Aggies football players
Jamaican players of American football